Errol Sitahal is a Trinidad and Tobago actor who has had various roles in several Hollywood and Caribbean films.  In 1995, he played a character named Ram Dass, the Indian manservant, in the film, A Little Princess.  The same year he also appeared with Chris Farley and David Spade in a scene from the movie Tommy Boy, where he played the third "Yes" executive.  In 2004, he played the stern Dr. Patel, father to Kumar (Kal Penn) and Kumar's older brother Saikat (Shaun Majumder), in Harold & Kumar Go to White Castle.

Sitahal has also acted on television.  In 2005 he starred with Shaun Majumder in the short film Plain Brown Rapper, playing Majumder's character's father for a second time.  He has had small parts, in one episode each, of the Canadian television series Side Effects, a medical drama, and in the American television series Relic Hunter.

In the intervening years, he has acted in numerous stage plays in Montreal, Toronto and the Caribbean. In early 2006, he starred in the Calypso musical The Brand New Lucky Diamond Horseshoe Club at Queen's Hall, Port of Spain, Trinidad.  The play was written and directed by Tony Hall with music and lyrics by David Rudder.

As of 2006, he is playing Samir, father of sons Sumesh and Raj, both of whom are principal characters on the Canadian television series 11 Cameras airing on the CBC.

In 2009, he plays Babaji, Indie Mehta's grandfather, in the Canadian TV series How To Be Indie. In definition of Babaji, he is an East Indian grandfather.

Filmography

External links

Canadian people of Indian descent
Trinidad and Tobago people of Indian descent
Living people
Trinidad and Tobago male film actors
Trinidad and Tobago male stage actors
Trinidad and Tobago male television actors
Year of birth missing (living people)
Place of birth missing (living people)
20th-century Trinidad and Tobago male actors
21st-century Trinidad and Tobago male actors
21st-century Trinidad and Tobago actors
20th-century Trinidad and Tobago actors